Miro Baldo Bento de Araújo (born 4 June 1975) is an East Timorese football player. He is a former Indonesia national football team player (1998–2000), before deciding to join the Timor-Leste national football team in 2005 after Timor-Leste's independence from Indonesia. He is now a coach in Boavista Futebol Clube Timor-Leste.

International career

|}

Honours

Club
PSM Makassar
 Liga Indonesia Premier Division: 1999–2000

International
Indonesia
 AFF Championship
 Runners-up (1): 2000

References

1975 births
Living people
East Timorese footballers
East Timorese expatriate footballers
Expatriate footballers in Indonesia
Timor-Leste international footballers
Indonesia international footballers
Indonesian footballers
Indonesian Super League-winning players
Persela Lamongan players
Persiba Balikpapan players
Persija Jakarta players
Persijap Jepara players
PSIS Semarang players
PSM Makassar players
Indonesian Premier Division players
People from Dili
Indonesian people of East Timorese descent
Association football forwards